Luca Nicolás Orellano (born 22 March 2000) is an Argentine professional footballer who plays as a right winger for Vasco da Gama.

Career

Vélez Sarsfield
Orellano started his youth career in 2009 with Vélez Sarsfield of the Primera División. He was moved into Gabriel Heinze's first-team during the 2018–19 season, making his professional debut on 25 November 2018 in an away win against Unión Santa Fe; he was substituted on for Jonathan Ramis with minutes remaining.

Vasco da Gama
On 13 January 2023 Vasco da Gama announced Orellano's transfer from Vélez Sarsfield for US$4m. He signed with the Brazilian club until 31 December 2025.

Career statistics
.

References

External links

2000 births
Living people
Argentine footballers
People from Moreno Partido
Association football wingers
Sportspeople from Buenos Aires Province
Argentine Primera División players
Campeonato Brasileiro Série A players
Club Atlético Vélez Sarsfield footballers
CR Vasco da Gama players
Argentine expatriate sportspeople in Brazil
Expatriate footballers in Brazil